Ladue is an inner-ring suburb of St. Louis, located in St. Louis County, Missouri. As of the 2020 census, the city had a population of 8,989.

Ladue has the highest median household income of any city in Missouri with a population over 1,000.

Geography
Ladue is located at  (38.636889, -90.381722).

Tilles Park is a large park within Ladue.

Demographics

2020 census
As of the 2020 census, there were 8,989 people and 3,159 households living in the city. The racial makeup of the city was 86.7% White, 1.2% African American, 0.1% Native American, 5.7% Asian, 0.3% from other races, and 5.9% from two or more races. Hispanic or Latino of any race were 2.4% of the population.

2010 census
As of the census of 2010, there were 8,521 people, 3,169 households, and 2,538 families residing in the city. The racial makeup of the city was 94.1% White, 1.0% African American, 0.1% Native American, 3.1% Asian, 0.1% Pacific Islander, 0.3% from other races, and 1.4% from two or more races. Hispanic or Latino of any race were 1.4% of the population.

There were 3,169 households, of which 36.6% had children under the age of 18 living with them, 72.6% were married couples living together, 5.6% had a female householder with no husband present, 1.9% had a male householder with no wife present, and 19.9% were non-families. 18.3% of all households were made up of individuals, and 10.3% had someone living alone who was 65 years of age or older. The average household size was 2.69 and the average family size was 3.06.

The median age in the city was 46.4 years. 27.4% of residents were under the age of 18; 4.3% were between the ages of 18 and 24; 16.1% were from 25 to 44; 33.7% were from 45 to 64, and 18.6% were 65 years of age or older. The gender makeup of the city was 48.5% male and 51.5% female.

2000 census
As of the census of 2000, there were 8,645 people, 3,414 households, and 2,598 families residing in the city. The racial makeup of the city was 96.83% White, 0.88% African American, 0.10% Native American, 1.49% Asian, 0.12% Pacific Islander, 0.13% from other races, and 0.45% from two or more races. Hispanic or Latino of any race were 0.78% of the population.

Ladue is Missouri's best-educated city, proportionately, with 74.5% of adult residents (25 and older) holding an associate degree or higher, and 71.8% of adults possessing a bachelor's degree or higher (2000 Census).

There were 3,414 households, out of which 31.4% had children under the age of 18 living with them, 70.6% were married couples living together, 4.0% had a female householder with no husband present, and 23.9% were non-families. 22.8% of all households were made up of individuals, and 14.4% had someone living alone who was 65 years of age or older. The average household size was 2.51 and the average family size was 2.94.

In the city the population was spread out, with 24.5% under the age of 18, 3.5% from 18 to 24, 16.9% from 25 to 44, 32.2% from 45 to 64, and 22.8% who were 65 years of age or older. The median age was 48 years. For every 100 females, there were 91.2 males. For every 100 females age 18 and over, there were 88.4 males.

The median income for a household in the city was $141,720, and the median income for a family was $179,328. Males had a median income of $100,000 versus $51,678 for females. The per capita income for the city was $89,623. About 1.4% of families and 2.1% of the population were below the poverty line, including 2.0% of those under age 18 and 2.4% of those age 65 or over.

Education
The Ladue School District serves all of Ladue and part of Frontenac, Olivette, Town and Country, and Creve Coeur. The Ladue School District is home to the elementary schools Conway, Old Bonhomme, Reed, and Spoede.  Ladue Horton Watkins High School is the only high school in the district and is located in Ladue. As of the 2015–2016 academic year, Ladue High School had an enrollment of 1,301 students.

Ladue is home to two of St. Louis' private high schools, the John Burroughs School and Mary Institute and St. Louis Country Day School (MICDS). As well as Community School for grades PK-6.

The Headquarters Branch of the St. Louis County Library is located in Ladue on Lindbergh Boulevard (US 67).

History
The historical anecdotes contained in this section were derived from the 2011 book "Ladue Found", written by Charlene Bry, former editor and owner of "The Ladue News."

Ladue began as a farming community St. Louis County suburb. After St. Louis City ejected St. Louis County in 1876, Ladue was known as ranges 4 and 5 of "Township 45," with Clayton being the political hub. Original Township 45 farming families included the Dennys, Dwyers, Conways, McCutcheons, McKnights (all Irish), Litzsinger, von Schraders, Spoedes, Luedloffs, Muellers, Seigers Per 1868 Pitzman map of St. Louis, as well as 1878 and 1909 maps of St. Louis County (all German),  LaDues (French), Warsons, Lays, Barnes, Prices, and Watsons (all English). Once automobiles replaced horse and wagon as the primary mode of transportation, farmers in the area began selling portions of their land to city workers who wished to live outside of the urban setting. Three small villages (Village of LaDue, Village of Deer Creek, and the Village of McKnight) merged in 1936 to become what is now known as Ladue. Ladue was named from Ladue Road, the main thoroughfare in the area that led from St. Louis City to wealthy entrepreneur Peter Albert LaDue's large property at the current intersection of Warson Road and Ladue Road (including St. Louis Country Club). Peter Albert LaDue was born in Kinderhook, New York, in 1821, a descendant of Pierre LaDoux, who arrived from France in the 1600s. He arrived in Saint Louis about 1848 and later became a prominent attorney, alderman, and banker and land speculator.

Controversies
In the early 1990s, the city tried to force a woman to take down a yard sign stating "Say No to the War in the Persian Gulf, Call Congress Now" as it violated a city law. The ACLU sued, arguing that the right to place the sign was protected by the 1st Amendment. The ensuing legal battle went to the United States Supreme Court which unanimously ruled, in City of Ladue v. Gilleo, that the right to place the sign was protected by the Constitution.

In 1986, the City of Ladue won a case against E. Terrence Jones and Joan Kelly Horn, a couple who had lived together for four years and who each brought children from a previous relationship. Ladue officials had requested that they marry or leave their home. The Missouri Court of Appeals sided with the city, stating in City of Ladue v. Horn that "A man and woman living together, sharing pleasures and certain responsibilities, does not per se constitute a family in even the conceptual sense. [...] There is no doubt that there is a governmental interest in marriage and in preserving the integrity of the biological or legal family. There is no concomitant governmental interest in keeping together a group of unrelated persons, no matter how closely they simulate a family. Further, there is no state policy which commands that groups of people may live under the same roof in any section of a municipality they choose." Under Chapter 213 of the Missouri Human Rights Act (§213.040.1), passed after the Ladue v. Horn case, housing discrimination on the basis of familial status is now an unlawful practice.

In 2010, the former chief of police, Larry White, sued the City of Ladue for wrongful termination. The suit was dismissed by the Circuit Court of St. Louis County in 2012 and the dismissal upheld by the Missouri Court of Appeals in 2013.

Despite comprising only 0.88% of the local population, black drivers in Ladue comprised 575 (of 4107 total, or 14%) stops in 2014. The resulting "disparity index" indicates a black driver was 15.98 times more likely than the average driver to be stopped by the Ladue Police Department in 2014, but the police department contends the statistics are skewed by the local racial composition.

Notable people

Chuck Berry, musician

Joe Buck, Fox Sports broadcaster

August Busch III, former Chairman of Anheuser-Busch
William H. T. Bush, brother of President George H. W. Bush
Maxine Clark, founder and CEO of Build-A-Bear Workshop
John Danforth, U.S. Senator from Missouri
William Henry Danforth, MD, Former Chancellor of Washington University in St. Louis
William DeWitt, Jr., chairman of the St. Louis Cardinals
George Preston Dorris (1874-1968), founder of Dorris Motors Corporation and St. Louis Motor Company, two early 20th-century automobile manufacturers
Jim Edmonds, former MLB player for the Cardinals lives in Ladue 
Ezekiel Elliott, running back for the Dallas Cowboys
David Farr, Chairman & CEO of Emerson Electric Company
Charles F. Knight, former Chairman of Emerson Electric Co.
Albert Bond Lambert, Olympic golfer and founder of Lambert-St. Louis International Airport
James Smith McDonnell, founder of McDonnell Douglas (now Boeing)
Gene McNary, former St Louis County Executive & former commissioner of the U.S. Immigration and Naturalization Service
Stan Musial, Hall of Fame Major League Baseball player 
Gyo Obata, founder of HOK Architecture
William B. Robertson, owner of Robertson Aircraft Corporation
Phyllis Schlafly, conservative activist and founder of Eagle Forum
Lt. Roz Schulte (1984-2009), National Intelligence Medal of Valor recipient and first female U.S. Air Force Academy graduate killed by enemy combatants in the U.S. War on Terrorism in Afghanistan
Andrew C. Taylor, CEO and Chairman of Enterprise Rent-A-Car and Enterprise Holdings
George Herbert Walker, founder of G. H. Walker & Co.
George Howard Williams, former U.S. Senator
Jay Williamson, PGA golfer

References

Cities in St. Louis County, Missouri
Cities in Missouri